Tun Mutahir may refer to:

 Tun Mutahir of Malacca (died 1510), Bendahara of Malacca
 Tun Mutahir of Pahang (1803–1863), Bendahara of Pahang